An autoclave is a pressure chamber used to sterilize equipment and supplies.

Autoclave may also refer to:
 Autoclave (industrial), utilized to process parts and materials under pressure, as in curing
 Waste autoclave, a form of solid waste treatment
 Autoclave (album), a 1991 indie rock album
 Autoclave (band), a short-lived indie rock band
 Autoclave cipher, a cipher which incorporates the message into the key
 "Autoclave", the fourth track on The Mountain Goats 2008 album, Heretic Pride